José Luis Soro Domingo (born 17 December 1966) is a Spanish politician from Chunta Aragonesista who serves as Regional Minister of Territorial Planning, Mobility and Housing since July 2015. He has been the president of CHA since February 2012.

References

Members of the Cortes of Aragon
1966 births
Living people
People from Zaragoza
Chunta Aragonesista politicians
Leaders of political parties in Spain